Corinne Foxx (born February 15, 1994) is an American actress. She is the daughter of actor and singer Jamie Foxx. She has attended Sierra Canyon High School, University of Southern California (USC) and various acting and improv schools.

Early life
Foxx was born on February 15, 1994, in Los Angeles. She is the daughter of Jamie Foxx, and his ex-girlfriend Connie Kline. In high school, she attended Sierra Canyon School where she was a cheerleader and was featured on the cover of American Cheerleader in 2011. She attended the University of Southern California, where she was a member of the class of 2016. She studied public relations, was a cheerleader, and was a member of the Pi Beta Phi sorority. After college, she attended Howard Fine Acting Studio and the American Academy of Dramatic Arts.

Career
At age six, she made a cameo in The Jamie Foxx Show and regularly served as her father's date on the red carpet growing up. She has appeared on Sweet/Vicious and served as Miss Golden Globe in 2016. She was announced as the DJ for the second season of Beat Shazam (on which her father is host) in 2018 and has a role in her father's directorial debut, All-Star Weekend, although the film was unreleased and considered indefinity shelved as of August 2022. She returned to her DJ role on Beat Shazam for its third season debut on May 20, 2019.

She made her formal modeling debut at the Bal des débutantes in November 2014. She began modeling in 2014, and she has represented brands such as Ralph Lauren, Dolce & Gabbana, Kenneth Cole, and Wet 'n' Wild cosmetics. She made her New York Fashion Week debut in 2016, walking for Kanye West's Yeezy line, and walked New York Fashion Week for Sherri Hill's Spring 2018 line in September 2017.

In 2019, she played Sasha in the horror sequel 47 Meters Down: Uncaged.

Filmography

Film

Television

Music Video

References

External links 

Year of birth missing (living people)
Living people
21st-century American actresses
21st-century African-American women
Actresses from Los Angeles
African-American actresses
American Academy of Dramatic Arts alumni
American cheerleaders
American television actresses
Female models from California
Sierra Canyon School alumni
University of Southern California alumni